Pilot Hill may refer to:

 Pilot Hill, California, an unincorporated community in El Dorado County, California, US
 Pilot Hill, Hampshire, the highest point of the county of Hampshire, UK
 Pilot Hill, Massachusetts, a hill on Martha's Vineyard, Massachusetts, US

See also
 Pilot Butte (disambiguation)
 Pilot Knob (disambiguation)
 Pilot Mountain (disambiguation)
 Pilot Peak (disambiguation)